The 2014–15 BFA Senior League is the 24th season of the Bahamas top-flight football league. The league consists of 13 clubs split into two groups.

League table
The season began on 22 October 2014, with defending champion Lyford Cay Dragons defeating COB 3-0.

Group 1

Group 2

Championship Round
Won by Western Warriors.

References

BFA Senior League seasons
Bahamas
BFA Senior League
BFA Senior League